The Tulane Journal of International and Comparative Law was founded at Tulane University Law School, in New Orleans, Louisiana, as an outgrowth of that institution's historical tradition as a signpost in the academic world for international and comparative law. The Journal is dedicated to discussing and debating all facets of international law, from human rights to transnational commerce to the historical evolution of current global law. The Journal is one of the leading law reviews in international and comparative law and, in terms of citation, is in the top quarter of all journals in the nation.

History
Lisa M. Ryan, a partner at Fragomen, Del Rey, Bernsen & Loewy's New York office, founded the journal while she was a student at the Tulane University Law School.

Distinguished alumni
José M. Ferrer, JD 1999, Miami partner of Baker & McKenzie, former Associate Executive Editor of the Journal
Lisa M. Ryan, JD 1994, New York City partner of Fragomen; founder of the Journal
David L. Glogoff, JD 1994, Chief Legal Officer; founder of the Journal

External links
 Tulane Journal of International and Comparative Law homepage 
 Tulane University Law School homepage 
 Tulane University homepage

See also
Comparative law
International law
List of International Law Journals
Tulane University Law School

References

International law journals
American law journals
Tulane University Law School
Biannual journals
Publications established in 1992
Comparative law journals
1992 establishments in Louisiana